The Philadelphia Barrage played their eighth season, as a charter member of the MLL (originally known as the Bridgeport Barrage), during the 2008 season of Major League Lacrosse. The Barrage ended up in 2nd place in the Eastern Conference with a record of 7-5. The Barrage qualified for the MLL Playoffs for the fourth time in franchise history. The Barrage lost to the Rattlers 16-15 in OT in the MLL Semifinals at Harvard Stadium on August 23, 2008.

Schedule

Playoffs

Major League Lacrosse seasons
Philadelphia Barrage Season, 2008
Lacrosse in Pennsylvania
2008 in sports in Pennsylvania